Glenbain is a hamlet and seat of Glen Bain Rural Municipality No. 105, Saskatchewan, Canada. It was on mile 53 of the Canadian Pacific Railway right of way, southeast of Swift Current.

See also

 List of communities in Saskatchewan
 Hamlets of Saskatchewan

References

Glen Bain No. 105, Saskatchewan
Unincorporated communities in Saskatchewan
Division No. 3, Saskatchewan